Musheramore is a 644 m (2,113 ft) mountain in County Cork, Ireland. It is the highest of the Boggeragh Mountains.

There are two holy wells on the mountain: one near the summit, for sick animals, and one on its northern slopes, for humans. The later is a place of worship and it's called St. John's Well.

See also
List of mountains in Ireland

References

Hewitts of Ireland
Marilyns of Ireland
Mountains and hills of County Cork
Mountains under 1000 metres